Jennifer Scott may refer to:
 Jennifer Scott (musician), Canadian singer and pianist
 Jennifer Scott (mathematician), British mathematician
 Jennifer Zhu Scott, entrepreneur and investor in Hong Kong

See also
 Jenny Scott, English journalist and economist